Foresight was a 28-gun galleon of the English Tudor navy, built by Mathew Baker at Deptford Dockyard and launched in 1570. It was a radical innovation over contemporary ships. When John Hawkins became Treasurer of the Navy in 1577, he had sailed all over the world, and his ideas contributed to the production of a new race-built series of galleons - of which the Foresight was the first - without the high fore- and after-castles prevalent in earlier galleons; these "marvels of marine design" could reputedly "run circles around the clumsier Spanish competition." As such, the Foresight was part of the English fleet which destroyed most of the Spanish Armada in 1588.

She was broken up in 1604.

Notes

References 

Citations

Bibliography

 Lavery, Brian (2003) The Ship of the Line - Volume 1: The development of the battlefleet 1650-1850. Conway Maritime Press. .
 Winfield, Rif (2009) British Warships in the Age of Sail 1603-1714: Design, Construction, Careers and Fates. Seaforth Publishing. .

Ships of the English navy
16th-century ships
Ships built in Deptford